The Jaunpur–Rae Bareli Express is an Express train belonging to Northern Railway zone that runs between  and  in India. It is currently being operated with 14201/14202 train numbers on a daily basis.

Service

The 14201/Jaunpur–Rae Bareli Express has an average speed of 36 km/hr and covers 202 km in 5h 40m. The 14202/Rai Bareli–Jaunpur Express has an average speed of 38 km/hr and covers 202 km in  5h 20m.

Route and halts 

The important halts of the train are:

Coach composition

The train has standard ICF rakes with max speed of 110 kmph. The train consists of 12 coaches :

 10 General Unreserved
 2 Seating cum Luggage Rake

Traction

Both trains are hauled by a Lucknow Loco Shed-based WDM-3A diesel locomotive from Rae Bareli to Jaunpur and vice versa.

See also 

 Rae Bareli Junction railway station
 Jaunpur Junction railway station

Notes

References

External links 

 14201/Jaunpur - Rae Bareli Express
 14202/Rai Bareli - Jaunpur Express

Transport in Jaunpur, Uttar Pradesh
Raebareli district
Rail transport in Uttar Pradesh